Prykolotne is an urban-type settlement in Kupiansk Raion of Kharkiv Oblast in Ukraine. It is located in the northeast of the oblast, at the source of the Khotomlia, a left tributary of the Donets in the drainage basin of the Don. Prykolotne belongs to Vilkhuvatka rural hromada, one of the hromadas of Ukraine. Population: 

Until 18 July 2020, Prykolotne belonged to Velykyi Burluk Raion. The raion was abolished in July 2020 as part of the administrative reform of Ukraine, which reduced the number of raions of Kharkiv Oblast to seven. The area of Velykyi Burluk Raion was merged into Kupiansk Raion.

Economy

Transportation
Prykolotne railway station in on the railway connecting Vovchansk and Kupiansk. There is infrequent passenger traffic.

The settlement has road connections with Vovchansk via Bilyi Kolodiaz and with Kupiansk and Chuhuiv via Velykyi Burluk.

References

Urban-type settlements in Kupiansk Raion